52 Cadogan Square is a Grade II* listed house in Cadogan Square, London SW1.

The house was built in 1886–87, and the architect was Sir Ernest George, who built it for Sir Thomas Andros de la Rue, 1st Baronet, chairman of security printers De La Rue.

De la Rue died at 52 Cadogan Square on 10 April 1911, and was buried at Golders Green.

References

Grade II* listed buildings in the Royal Borough of Kensington and Chelsea
Grade II* listed houses in London
Houses completed in 1887
Houses in the Royal Borough of Kensington and Chelsea
Ernest George buildings